Yule Be Wiggling is the twelfth Wiggles album (and 2nd Christmas album) released in 2000 by ABC Music and distributed by EMI.

Track list

Personnel
The Wiggles
 Greg Page – vocals
 Murray Cook – guitar, bass, background vocals
 Anthony Field – guitar, background vocals
 Jeff Fatt – background vocals

Additional personnel
 Morgan Crowley, Denise O'Kane – vocals
 John Field, Terry Murray – guitar
 Dominic Lindsay – trumpet
 Maria Schattovits – violin
 Margaret Linsday – cello
 Tony Henry – drums
 Phil South – percussion
 Mark Punch – background vocals

Gallery

Charts

Certifications

Video

Yule Be Wiggling is the second Wiggles Christmas video, released in October 2001.

Songs
 Doing a Dance
 Just Can't Wait for Christmas Day
 Here Come the Reindeer
 And the World is One on a Christmas Morning
 Murray's Christmas Samba
 Jimmy the Elf
 Curoo Curoo (The Carol of the Birds)
 Christmas Around the World
 Wags Loves to Shake Shake
 Jingle Bells
 Angels We Have Heard on High
 Christmas Polka
 Decorate the Tree
 A Scottish Christmas
 Come on Everybody (We'll Tap for You)
 Yule Be Wiggling

Cast
The cast as presented on the videos:

 The Wiggles are
 Murray Cook
 Jeff Fatt
 Anthony Field
 Greg Page

Additional Cast
 Captain Feathersword: Paul Paddick
 Dorothy the Dinosaur: Carolyn Ferrie
 Henry the Octopus: Jeff Fatt 
 Wags the Dog: Jeff Fatt
Santa Claus

Notes

References

External links

2000 Christmas albums
2001 video albums
The Wiggles albums
Christmas albums by Australian artists
Australian children's musical films
The Wiggles videos